Kazimierz Stafiej (born 22 February 1968 in Nowa Sarzyna) is a Polish former road cyclist. He competed as a professional from 1996 to 2007.

Major results

1994
 7th Overall Regio-Tour
2000
 5th Overall Tour of Japan
1st Mountains classification
1st Stage 5
 5th Memoriał Andrzeja Trochanowskiego
2001
 1st Stage 1 Tour of Małopolska
 2nd Overall Ringerike GP
 4th Overall Herald Sun Tour
 5th Grand Prix Midtbank
 5th GP Aarhus
 10th Overall Tour of Japan
1st Stage 4
2002
 3rd Memoriał Henryka Łasaka
 7th GP Rudy Dhaenens
 7th Ronde van Drenthe
 8th Overall Tour of Japan
2003
 1st Puchar Ministra Obrony Narodowej
 1st Stage 1 Szlakiem Grodów Piastowskich
 3rd Tartu Grand Prix
 6th Tallinn–Tartu Grand Prix
 6th Lubelski Wyscig 3-Majowy
2004
 1st Szlakiem Walk Majora Hubala
 2nd Klasyk im. Wincentego Witosa
 6th Memoriał Henryka Łasaka
 9th Overall Tour of Małopolska
2005
 6th Szlakiem Walk Majora Hubala
2006
 2nd Overall Bałtyk–Karkonosze Tour
 3rd Road race, National Road Championships
 4th GP Kooperativa
 7th Overall Tour of Małopolska
 7th Memoriał Andrzeja Trochanowskiego
 9th Puchar Uzdrowisk Karpackich
2007
 1st Stage 5 Okolo Slovenska
 2nd Puchar Ministra Obrony Narodowej
 2nd Puchar Uzdrowisk Karpackich
 9th Overall Szlakiem Walk Majora Hubala
 9th GP Hydraulika Mikolasek
 10th Overall Tour of Croatia
 10th Overall Course de Solidarność et des Champions Olympiques

References

External links

1968 births
Living people
Polish male cyclists
People from Leżajsk County